Jenkins is a lunar impact crater that lies along the equator of the Moon, near the eastern limb. It is attached to the eastern rim of the slightly larger crater Schubert X, intruding somewhat into the interior. The crater Nobili is likewise attached to the western rim of Schubert X and intrudes slightly into the interior on that side. The three craters form a linear chain along the equator.

This formation was previously designated Schubert Z before being given its current name by the IAU. Schubert itself is located to the northeast of Jenkins. To the east-northeast of Jenkins lies the crater Back, and to the south is the crater pair of Van Vleck and Weierstrass.

This is a circular crater with a somewhat worn rim. The small crater Schubert J is attached to the exterior along the southeast. The western rim of Jenkins is marked by several small craterlets. The interior floor is relatively featureless, and is marked by a few tiny craterlets. There is no central peak on the floor.

References

 
 
 
 
 
 
 
 
 
 
 
 

Impact craters on the Moon